Cyrus Dan Prescott (August 15, 1836 – October 23, 1902) was a U.S. Representative from New York.

Born in New Hartford, New York, Prescott pursued an academic course and was graduated from Utica Free Academy.
He studied law in Utica and in Rome, New York.
He was admitted to the bar in 1859 and commenced practice in Rome in 1860.
He moved to New York City in 1867 and was employed as a financial clerk in a wholesale house.
He returned to Rome, New York, in 1868 and continued the practice of law.
He served as member of the Board of Aldermen of Rome 1874-1876.
He was a member of the New York State Assembly (Oneida Co., 3rd D.) in 1878.

Prescott was elected as a Republican to the Forty-sixth and Forty-seventh Congresses (March 4, 1879 – March 3, 1883).
He was not a candidate for renomination in 1882.
He resumed the practice of law in Rome, New York.
Attorney for the New York Central Railroad Co. for over thirty years.
He died in Rome, New York, October 23, 1902.
He was interred in Sauquoit Valley Cemetery, near Clayville, New York.

Sources

External links

 

1836 births
1902 deaths
Politicians from Rome, New York
Republican Party members of the United States House of Representatives from New York (state)
19th-century American politicians